José Joaquín Agulló Sánchez de Belmont y Ripalda (1810–1878) was a Spanish nobleman, who held the titles of VI Conde de Ripalda, IV Marqués de Campo Salinas and Barón de Tamarit. He was the founder of the Spanish Red Cross, and Senator for life between 1864 and 1868.

Biography 

José Agulló was born in Valencia, the son of José de Agulló and Josefa Sánchez Bellmont, belonging to a distinguished Valencian family of Catalan and Navarrese roots. He was married to María Josefa Paulín y de la Peña, daughter of Roque de Paulin Quijano and María de la Peña Sánchez. They had three daughters, Dolores de Agulló y Paulín, (Countess of Ripalda), María de Agulló y Paulín and Isabel de Agulló y Paulín.

In 1860 José Joaquín Agulló, moves to England, to attend as official representative of Spain, in the International Statistical Institute held in London. In 1865 Agulló was appointed Minister of Agriculture, Industry and Commerce. He also was the co-founder of the Spanish Red Cross, and presided over the Real Academia de Bellas Artes de San Carlos de Valencia.

Gallery

References

External links 
www.rmcv.es
www.raco.cat
www.euskalnet.net

1810 births
1878 deaths
19th-century Spanish nobility
People from Valencia